Jon Peter Taylor (born 20 July 1992) is an English professional footballer who plays as a winger for Doncaster Rovers.

Career

Shrewsbury Town
After being released as a youth trainee by Wigan Athletic, Taylor moved to Shrewsbury Town in 2008, having been recommended to the club by former Shrewsbury midfielder, Tony Kelly. Whilst still a youth player, he featured for Shrewsbury's first team sporadically in the 2009–10 season under manager Paul Simpson, making his début as a substitute in a League Two 1–0 away win against Chesterfield on 2 January 2010.

Taylor signed his first professional contract at Shrewsbury prior to the 2010–11 season, and made his first home start against Burton Albion on 1 February 2011, scoring twice in a 3–0 home win under new manager Graham Turner. He went on to make 22 appearances that season, scoring six goals, and earning the plaudits of his manager and then Shrewsbury captain Ian Sharps, as well as winning the Football League Young Player of the Month award for February 2011.

Having been linked with a move to Scottish clubs Motherwell or Aberdeen, Taylor signed a new two-year deal at Shrewsbury Town on 23 June 2011, following emergency talks with Graham Turner, and made 36 appearances in all competitions in the 2011–12 season where they secured promotion up to League One.

Not having scored a first team goal since March 2011, Taylor rediscovered his goal scoring touch in a 2–1 away defeat at Leyton Orient on 10 November 2012, and scored five more times in the 2012–13 season to help steer Shrewsbury clear of relegation during their first season in League One.

Taylor signed another two-year contract extension at Shrewsbury Town on 21 June 2013, making his 100th appearance in all competitions against MK Dons on 3 August 2013. He ended the 2013–14 season as Shrewsbury's top scorer, with nine goals in League One, although this was ultimately not enough to prevent the club's relegation.

Peterborough United
Following Shrewsbury Town's relegation to League Two, Taylor signed for Peterborough United for an undisclosed fee on 4 June 2014.

Rotherham United
On 3 August 2016, Taylor signed for Rotherham United for an undisclosed fee, understood to be a "club record deal". He agreed a three-year contract. On 30 May 2019 the club announced that Taylor would be leaving at the end of the season, as his contract expired.

Doncaster Rovers
Doncaster Rovers signed Taylor on 9 August 2019 on a two-year deal with an option on a third.

Career statistics

Footnotes

A.  Soccerbase incorrectly states that Jon Taylor played for Shrewsbury Town in a match against Burton Albion on 16 January 2010. It was actually Danny Taylor who played in this match, whilst Jon Taylor was an unused substitute. Therefore, unless corrected, Jon Taylor always has one less football league appearance than what is stated on Soccerbase.

Honours
Rotherham United
EFL League One play-offs: 2018

References

External links

1992 births
Living people
Footballers from Liverpool
English footballers
Association football wingers
Shrewsbury Town F.C. players
Peterborough United F.C. players
Rotherham United F.C. players
Doncaster Rovers F.C. players
English Football League players